The Pantheon of the House of Braganza (Portuguese: Panteão da Casa de Bragança), also known as the Pantheon of the Braganzas (Panteão dos Bragança), is the final resting place for many of the members of the House of Braganza, located in the Monastery of São Vicente de Fora in the Alfama district of Lisbon, Portugal. The pantheon's burials have included Portuguese monarchs, Brazilian monarchs, a Romanian monarch, queen consorts of Portugal, and notable Infantes of Portugal, among others.

History

The Pantheon was created under orders from Ferdinand II of Portugal, transforming the old refectory of the monastery into the burial place it is today. The majority of the tombs are located on the sides of the pantheon, and are simple marble boxes with spaces of four tombs. If the tomb is of a monarch, it has a crown engraved in gold on the side of the tomb and a crown placed on top of the entire set of tombs. The tombs in the center aisle of the pantheon are those belonging to Carlos I of Portugal, Luís Filipe, Prince Royal of Portugal, Manuel II of Portugal and Queen Amélie of Orléans; the two martyrs of the Lisbon Regicide, the last King of Portugal and the last Queen consort of Portugal.

Burials

Monarchs and consorts
King João IV of Portugal
Queen Consort Luisa de Guzmán
King Afonso VI of Portugal
Queen Consort Maria Francisca of Savoy
King Pedro II of Portugal
Queen Consort Maria Sophia of Neuburg
King João V of Portugal
Queen Consort Maria Anna of Austria
King José I of Portugal
Queen Consort Mariana Victoria of Spain
King Pedro III of Portugal
King João VI of Portugal
Queen Consort Carlota Joaquina of Spain
Queen Maria II of Portugal
Prince Consort Auguste de Beauharnais
King Fernando II of Portugal
King Miguel I of Portugal
Princess Adelaide of Löwenstein-Wertheim-Rosenberg (married Miguel after his deposition and the restoration of Queen Maria II)
King Pedro V of Portugal
Queen Consort Stephanie of Hohenzollern-Sigmaringen
King Luís I of Portugal
King Carlos I of Portugal
Queen Consort Amélie of Orléans
King Manuel II of Portugal

Notable princes and infantes
Children of King João IV
Prince Teodósio, Prince of Brazil, eldest son
Princess Joana, Princess of Beira, second daughter
Queen Catherine of Braganza, Queen of England, Scotland, and Ireland, third daughter

Children of King Pedro II
Prince João, Prince of Brazil, eldest son
Infante Francisco, Duke of Beja, third son
Infante António of Portugal, fourth son
Infante Manuel, Count of Ourém, fifth son
Princess Isabel Luísa, Princess of Beira, eldest daughter
Infanta Francisca Josefa of Portugal, fourth daughter

Children of King João V
Prince Pedro, Prince of Brazil, eldest son
Infante Carlos of Portugal, third son
Infante Alexandre of Portugal, fifth son
José of Braganza, High Inquisitor of Portugal, illegitimate son

Children of King José I
Infanta Maria Ana Francisca of Portugal, second daughter
Infanta Maria Doroteia of Portugal, third daughter
Princess Benedita, Princess of Brazil, fourth daughter

Children of Queen Maria I
Prince José, Prince of Brazil, eldest son

Children of King João VI
Prince Francisco António, Prince of Beira, eldest son
Infanta Isabel Maria, Regent of Portugal, fourth daughter
Infanta Maria da Assunção of Portugal, fifth daughter

Children of Queen Maria II
Infante João, Duke of Beja, fourth child and third son
Infante Fernando, seventh child and fourth son
Infante Augusto, Duke of Coimbra, eighth child and fifth son

Children of King Luís I
Infante Afonso, Duke of Porto, younger son, later Prince Royal of Portugal

Children of King Carlos I
Infante Luís Filipe, Prince Royal of Portugal, elder son

Braganza monarchs and consorts not buried at the pantheon
All of the Braganza monarchs of Portugal are buried at the royal pantheon, from John IV (1603–1656) to Manuel II (1889–1932), except:

Queen Maria I is buried in the Estrela Basilica in Lisbon. She died in 1816, while the Royal Court was in Rio de Janeiro, Brazil, and was initially laid to rest at the Ajuda Convent in Rio de Janeiro, but her remains were brought to Lisbon after the return of the Royal Family to Portugal. However, she was never buried in the Braganza Pantheon, and instead the Estrela Basilica was chosen as her resting place.
King Pedro IV, also known as Emperor Pedro I of Brazil, was initially buried in the Pantheon, but his remains were offered to Brazil in 1972 (to mark the 150th anniversary of the Brazilian Proclamation of Independence) and they were then laid to rest at the Imperial Crypt and Chapel within the Monument to the Independence of Brazil in São Paulo, Brazil. His heart is interred in the Church of Our Lady of Lapa, in Porto, Portugal.
 Maria Leopoldina, who was Queen Consort of Portugal during the brief reign of Pedro IV, is interred next to the body of her husband at the Monument to the Independence of Brazil in São Paulo, Brazil. She became a Portuguese Princess by marriage when she wed the then Prince Pedro, Prince Royal of the United Kingdom of Portugal, Brazil and the Algarves in 1817, while the Portuguese Royal Court was in Rio de Janeiro. She subsequently remained in Brazil with her husband, and became Empress Consort of Brazil when Pedro proclaimed the independence of Brazil and was acclaimed as Emperor Pedro I. When Pedro briefly held the Portuguese Crown as King Pedro IV from March to May, 1826, Empress Maria Leopoldina became Queen Consort of Portugal. She died in December 1826, and, before her remains were transferred to the Imperial Crypt and Chapel at the Monument to the Independence of Brazil in 1972, she was initially buried at the Imperial Mausoleum of St. Anthony's Convent in Rio de Janeiro.
Queen Consort Maria Pia, consort of King Luís I of Portugal, having returned to her native Italy in her widowhood after the deposition of the Portuguese Monarchy in 1910, is buried in the Pantheon of the House of Savoy in the Basilica of Superga in Turin, Italy.
Princess Augusta Victoria of Hohenzollern, consort of King Manuel II of Portugal (the couple wed after his deposition and the abolition of the Monarchy), is buried at Langenstein Castle, owned by the family of her second husband (Count Robert Douglas).

Former burials
Emperor Pedro II of Brazil, a member of the House of Braganza and son of King Pedro IV, was buried in the Pantheon in 1891 and remained there until 1921 when his body was repatriated to Brazil, where it is currently buried at the Imperial Mausoleum of the Cathedral of St. Peter of Alcantara in Petrópolis. After the military coup d'état that proclaimed Brazil a Republic on 15 November 1889 the Brazilian Imperial Family was sent into exile, and were received and given protection by their Braganza cousins who still reigned in Portugal. After the death of his wife, Empress Teresa Cristina, on 28 December 1889, Pedro II decided to move to France, and settled in Paris, where he died on 5 December 1891. After a State Funeral hosted by the French authorities at the Church of St. Mary Magdalen, his body was moved by train to Portugal, and was solemnly buried at the Braganza Pantheon. After the 1920 revocation of the decree that banished the Imperial Family from Brazil, the Emperor's body was returned to Brazil, and a Brazilian State Funeral for the former Emperor was finally held in 1921, on the occasion of the provisional reburial of his remains at the then Cathedral of Rio de Janeiro. In 1939, the construction of a mausoleum at Petrópolis Cathedral, intended to serve as the Emperor's final resting place, was completed, and his remains were again solemnly transferred and reburied there.
 Empress Teresa Cristina of Brazil, wife of the deposed Brazilian Emperor Pedro II and therefore a member of the House of Braganza by marriage, was laid to rest in the Pantheon from her death in December 1889 (shortly after the coup d'état that proclaimed Brazil a Republic and sent the Imperial Family into exile), until 1921, when her remains were returned to Brazil together with those of her husband. At present her body rests at the Imperial Mausoleum in the Cathedral of St. Peter of Alcantara in Petrópolis.
 Empress Amélia of Brazil, another member of the House of Braganza by marriage, second wife of Emperor Pedro I of Brazil (Pedro had reigned as King Pedro IV of Portugal but the couple wed after his abdication of the Portuguese Crown) and Duchess of Braganza (as wife and later as widow of the Duke of Braganza, the title that her husband assumed after his abdication of the Brazilian Crown), remained in Portugal during her widowhood and was buried in the Pantheon from her death in 1873 until 1982, when her remains were ceded to Brazil and transferred to the Imperial Crypt and Chapel at the Monument to the Independence of Brazil in São Paulo.
Princess Maria Amélia of Brazil, also a member of the House of Braganza, King Pedro IV's only child from his second marriage, conceived after his abdication of the Portuguese Crown, and born in Europe after his abdication of the Brazilian Crown, was buried in the Pantheon from her moving from Madeira a few months after her death in 1853 until 1982, when her remains were ceded to Brazil and transferred to the Imperial Mausoleum at St. Anthony's Convent in Rio de Janeiro, where they are buried alongside the remains of several other princes and princesses descended from the Emperors of Brazil.
King Carol II of Romania, a great-grandson of Maria II and Ferdinand II who died in Portugal while in exile, and his wife Magda Lupescu (the couple were married after his abdication of the Romanian Crown) were buried in the pantheon before the return of their bodies to Romania in 2003. They are now buried in the Orthodox Cathedral of Curtea de Argeș, alongside other Romanian royals.

See also

Monastery of São Vicente de Fora
List of Portuguese monarchs

Sources

Royal Pantheon of the Braganza Dynasty (In Portuguese)
History of the Royal Pantheon of the Braganza Dynasty (In Portuguese)

Portuguese monarchy
Mausoleums in Portugal
Monuments and memorials in Lisbon
Burial sites of the House of Braganza
Burial sites of the House of Beauharnais